Fernando Navarro (born 1980) is a Spanish screenwriter. He is also a music critic.

Biography 
Fernando Navarro was born in Granada in 1980. After considering to try to become a drummer for a music band, he started writing film screenplays. He has since penned or co-penned the screenplays of Toro, Spy Time, Veronica, Muse, Taxi to Gibraltar, Unknown Origins, Below Zero, A Perfect Enemy, and Venus.

He has been nominated twice to the Goya Awards; for Veronica (Best Original Screenplay) and for Unknown Origins (Best Adapted Screenplay).

In 2022, Navarro released his first book, Malaventura, published by Impedimenta.

References 

1980 births
Living people
21st-century Spanish screenwriters
Spanish music critics